Isfahan University of Medical Sciences also known as Medical University of Isfahan (MUI) (Danushgah-e 'lum-e Pezeshki-ye vâ Xedâmat-e Behedashti-ye Dârmati-ye Esfehan) is a university specializing in basic medical sciences, clinical science, and health services, located in Isfahan, Iran.

Isfahan University of Medical Sciences is one of the Iranian medical schools. Admission to the university is limited to students with top scores on the national entrance examination, administered yearly by the Ministry of Science, Research and Technology (Iran).

Isfahan ?? University of Medical Sciences was founded by Great Avicenna(Ibn_sina), under the patronage of the Kakouid ruler Alla-al-Dowleh in 1024/1025. It soon became one of the leading educational centers of the historic Muslim world. Isfahan University of Medical Sciences (IUMS), was established in 1946, as the Isfahan Higher School of Health Education. In 1950, the Isfahan Faculty of Medicine was inaugurated and students were admitted for the M.D. degrees after a 6-year medical training course.. Today, the university campus is located on Hezarjarib Street in southern Isfahan.

Isfahan University of Medical Sciences provides undergraduate, graduate and postgraduate programs in 10 faculties and 75 main departments. The student body consists of about 10,000 students from all 31 provinces of Iran and some foreign countries. Funding for Isfahan University of Medical Sciences is provided by the government (via the ministry of health and medical education) and through some private investments.

History 
The idea to establish the modern university came from doctors at the Amin Hospital in 1939. Finally, the hospital's board of directors approved a plan to establish the Isfahan Higher Institute of Health in 1946. Isfahan University of Medical Sciences was established as a modern institution in 1946 under the name "The Higher Institute of Health" and later was elevated to the "School of Medicine".

In September of the same year, an ad signed by lecturer Dr. Jelveh, then caretaker of Isfahan Province Health and Medical Treatment Department, was published in local newspapers calling on prospective students to enroll in the new institute.

The first classes were held at the old Sa'di High School (now the Soureh Institute). Many more students enrolled in subsequent years. Therefore, the institute had to find a larger campus to accommodate the growing number of new students. As a result, the Isfahan University was founded to accommodate these students and establish new faculties.

On October 29, 1950, the first series of classes were held at the new campus, named the University of Isfahan. The newly established school of Medicine at Sa'di School and Literature College on Shahzadeh Ebrahim Street joined the University of Isfahan and relocated themselves to the main campus.

The university later offered programs in human sciences, engineering and medical sciences. Related programs of medical sciences, although they were the parent programs of Isfahan University, were then separated from the University of Isfahan and became an independent university named Isfahan University of Medical Sciences(IUMS) in 1985.

With 12 hospitals and 75 departments, the university is currently a regional health care provider and the main medical center in Isfahan Province and central Iran.

Schools 
 School of Health
 School of Nursing and Midwifery
 School of Medicine
 School of Nutrition & Food Sciences
 School of Pharmacy & Pharmaceutical Sciences
 School of Dentistry
 School of Rehabilitation Sciences
 School of Advanced Technologies in Medical Sciences
 School of Allied Medical Sciences
 School of Management & Medical Information Sciences

Research 
International cooperation with the German partners in the following fields is of special importance
	Development of Novel Therapeutics and Diagnostics/ Theranostics
	Artificial Intelligence and Information Technology in Medicine
	Regenerative Medicine and Cell Therapy
	Big Data to Knowledge
	Precision Medicine
	Medical Robotics

Several cooperation projects in recent years have been initiated with German universities. To name a few examples of successful projects:
	Student exchange in the field of IT with the University of Passau running since 2015
	joint international conference on climate protection with the strong involvement of professors from Germany
	Joint research project in the field of intercultural communication in cooperation with HU Berlin (in work).

IUMS has one of the largest network of research in medical sciences. Besides the research done in different departments of its faculties, it is now handling several research centers in central Iran.

MUI Journals 

Isfahan University of Medical Sciences (IUMS) currently publishes 14 peer reviewed journals in different fields of basic and clinical, medical and paramedical sciences. Many of these journals are indexed by international indexers.

Online management services for editorial workflow of university journals were established in 2004 and became fully operational by 2005.

Hospitals 

MUI governs 17 training hospitals which provide health services for the people of Isfahan province and also neighboring provinces. Students, Externs, interns and residents are trained in these hospitals by attending faculty of MUI training hospitals.

See also 
 Education in Iran
 Higher Education in Iran
 International rankings of Iran
 Science and technology in Iran
 List of universities in Iran
 List of medical schools in the Middle East
 List of Iranian scientists and scholars
 Ministry of Health and Medical Education
 Health care in Iran

References

Medical schools in Iran
Universities in Iran
Educational institutions established in 1946
Education in Isfahan
Universities in Isfahan Province
1946 establishments in Iran
Buildings and structures in Isfahan
Isfahan University of Medical Sciences